Robert is a 2015 British horror film written and directed by Andrew Jones. It stars Suzie Frances Garton, Lee Bane, Flynn Allen, Judith Haley and Megan Lockhurst. The film was inspired by a haunted doll named Robert.

Plot
When their young son acquires a vintage doll a family begins experiencing terrifying, unexplainable occurrences.

Cast
 Suzie Frances Garton as Jenny Otto
 Lee Bane as Paul Otto
 Flynn Allen as Gene Otto
 Judith Haley as Agatha
 Megan Lockhurst as Martha
 Cyd Casados as Debbie
 Samuel Hutchison as Steven
 Annie Davies as Marcie
 Ryan Michaels as Clarence

Release
4Digital Media acquired the distribution of the film in UK and US and was released on August 24, 2015.

Sequels
Four sequels have followed: The Curse of Robert the Doll was released on September 12, 2016, The Toymaker on August 21, 2017, The Revenge of Robert the Doll on March 6, 2018, and Robert Reborn on June 24, 2019.

Reception
On Culture Crypt the film has a review score of 25 out of 100 indicating "unfavorable reviews".

Corey Danna of Horrornews.net wrote:

References

External links
 
 

2015 horror films
2010s supernatural horror films
Films about haunted dolls
Films about sentient toys
Horror films about toys
British horror films
2010s English-language films
Films directed by Andrew Jones
2010s British films